The Acadèmia Valenciana de la Llengua ("Valencian Academy of the Language"), also known by the acronym AVL, is an institution created on September 16, 1998, by the Valencian Parliament, which belongs to the set of official institutions that compose the Generalitat Valenciana, according to the Act of Autonomy of the Valencian Community.

Its primary function is to determine and set the official standards for the Valencian language as used in the Valencian Community (known in other territories as Catalan), and foster its use. According to its foundational law, the AVL linguistic regulations for Valencian must follow current Valencian genuine linguistic reality, respect Valencian lexicographic and literary tradition and start from the consolidated regulations based upon the Normes de Castelló, a set of orthographic rules for Valencian signed in 1932.

The headquarters of the Acadèmia Valenciana de la Llengua are in Valencia.
In addition this variety of the language follows the pattern of Pompeu Fabra standards who standardized the Catalan language in Catalonia. The AVL linguistic rule does not differ a great deal from the IEC (Institute for Catalan Studies) standards. Nevertheless, AVL grammar (Gramàtica normativa valenciana) includes some specific features of Valencian syntax, and its dictionary (Diccionari normatiu valencià) contains thousands of words which are specific for the Valencian variety, as well as Valencian specific verb conjugation and some accent marks which differ from the Catalan language in Catalonia.

Notes

External links 
Acadèmia Valenciana de la Llengua – Web site of this institution (Valencian)

Valencian
Catalan language
Language regulators
Valencian Community
1998 establishments in Spain
Organizations established in 1998